Roberto de Visiani (1800-1878) (in ) was an Italian botanist, naturalist and scholar. He is seen as one of the fathers of modern botany in Italy.

Early career 
He was the son of a physician and a close friend of his fellow citizen Niccolò Tommaseo. After finishing his studies in his hometown and the seminary in Split, he entered in 1817 the University of Padua, from which he graduated in Medicine in 1822.

Since he was a boy he had various interests, from literature to science, but his predilection went immediately to botany, at the time considered a branch of medicine: in Padua his interest focused on the local botanical garden, to which he devoted himself as a student.

After serving as a university assistant, he returned to Dalmatia in 1827 to work as a doctor (in Šibenik, Drniš, Kotor and Budva).  At the same time, he maintained a correspondence with his Paduan master, professor Giuseppe Antonio Bonato who during the same years tried to establish the autonomous teaching of botany in the Paduan university.

De Visiani wrote of some plants to the director of the "Gazzetta Botanica" ("Botanische Zeitung") of Regensburg, and shortly thereafter he was invited to collaborate with the magazine. Between 1828 and 1830 he published the classification and description of over fifty species discovered by him.

Works available online

References

1800 births
1878 deaths
19th-century Italian botanists